Warsaw Airport may refer to the following airports in Poland:

 Warsaw Chopin Airport (IATA: WAW, ICAO: EPWA), Poland's busiest airport, previously known as Warsaw-Okecie Airport
 Warsaw Modlin Airport (IATA: WMI, ICAO: EPMO), Warsaw's secondary airport, intended to be used by low-cost carriers
 Warsaw Babice Airport (ICAO: EPBC), also known as Bemowo, for civil, sports, and Interior Ministry use

See also
 Warsaw Municipal Airport (disambiguation) for airports in the United States